Cambridgeport is one of the neighborhoods of Cambridge, Massachusetts. It is bounded by Massachusetts Avenue, the Charles River, the Grand Junction Railroad, and River Street. The neighborhood contains predominantly residential homes, many of the triple decker style common in New England. Central Square, at the northernmost part of Cambridgeport, is an active commercial district and transportation hub, and University Park is a collection of renovated or recently constructed office and apartment buildings. The neighborhood also includes Fort Washington Park, several MIT buildings, and Magazine Beach.

The neighborhood is Area 5 of Cambridge.

History 
The Fig Newton cookie (named after nearby Newton, Massachusetts) was first manufactured in Cambridgeport in 1891 at the F. A. Kennedy Steam Bakery.

Portions of the neighborhood would have been demolished as part of the Inner Belt highway project first planned in 1948 but canceled in 1971 after intense protests organized by community activists, and following Gov. Francis Sargent's 1970 moratorium on highway construction inside Route 128. The interstate would have followed the path of Brookline Street to the Boston University Bridge.

Demographics
In 2010 the neighborhood had a population of 12,220 residents living in 5,391 households. In 1999, the average household income was $45,294.

References

Neighborhoods in Cambridge, Massachusetts
Warehouse districts of the United States